Jehangir Bomanji Petit (21 August 1879 ― 1946) was a noted nationalist, mill owner, philanthropist and one of Mahatma Gandhi's earliest supporters.

Belonging to the Petit family, Jehangir was the grandson of Sir Dinshaw Maneckjee Petit and the eldest son of the Bomanjee Dinshaw Petit He inherited ownership of Petit Mills and additionally served as the Chairman of the Bombay Mill Owners Association.

He was amongst the first supporters of Mahatma Gandhi and when on 9 January 1915, when Gandhi reached India and Bombay for the first time J. B. Petit along with other Indian nationalists like Narottam Morarji, Bhalchandra Krishna, B. G. Horniman, Revashanker Zaveri, Maganlal Gandhi took a launch to reach the steamer to welcome Kasturba and Mohandas Gandhi at Apollo bunder, where a large crowd had gathered to welcome Gandhi.  Later on 12 January 1915, J. B. Petit organized a reception at his bungalow the Mount Petit on Pedder Road. Over 600 distinguished citizens-both Europeans and Indians were present. Prominent among them were M. A. Jinnah, Seth Bomanjee Dinshaw Petit, Kaikobad Dinshaw, C. H. Setalvad, B. G. Horniman, Gokuldas Kahnadas Parekh,  Gopal Krishna Gokhale, Sir Jamshetjee Jeejebhoy, Sir Cowasjee Jehangir, Sir Narayan Chandavarkar, Sir Currimbhoy Ibrahim, Fazulbhoy Currimbhoy, Bhalechandra Krishna, Manmohandas Ramjee, Hazee Esmail, Dinsha Vaccha, Richard Amphlett Lamb, K. M. Munshi, Pherozeshah Mehta, Sir Dorab Tata, C. Dinshaw Adenwallah, Hormusji Wadia, Narayan Madhav Samarth  and Sir Claude Hill. He donated generously to the cause of nation and was amongst the first benefactors of Gandhi in India. He was in contact with Gandhi even before his arrival in India and has supported Gandhi's struggle in Transvaal in South Africa and activities of Servants of India Society. During the trial of 1922 of Mohandas Gandhi, he stood closely with him.

J.B. Petit High School for Girls at Mumbai, named after him is one of the noted institutions, which was patronized by him. Jehangir Bomanji Petit also impressed on his father Seth Bomanji D. Petit to give a munificent donation viz. of the immovable property called "Cumballa Hotel" at Cumballa and this led to foundation of Bomanjee Dinshaw Petit Parsee General Hospital in year 1907. He was the
Secretary of the South African Indian Fund. and Joint secretary of South African Indian Passive Resistance Fund. He was associated with Friends of India. He was an activist of the nationalist movement and one of the first supporter of Mahatma Gandhi. He was a member of 1927 Bombay Legislative Council as a representative of Bombay Mill Owners Association. Further, he also helped in promoting the Free Press of India. J. B. Petit had assisted Sir Pherozeshah Mehta in launching the newspaper and later went on to control the Indian Daily Mail.

J. B Petit died in 1946.

References

1879 births
1946 deaths
Indian philanthropists
Businesspeople from Mumbai
Parsi people from Mumbai
Activists from Maharashtra
Indian newspaper founders
Gandhians
Businesspeople in British India